The  is a comprehensive cancer center in Yokohama, Japan. The Cancer Center which consists of research institute and hospital is now an ancillary establishment of Kanagawa Prefectural Hospital Organization. In 2015, I-ROCK (Ion-beam Radiation Oncology Center in Kanagawa) in the Cancer Center will be open as a new Heavy-ion treatment center.

History
The Kanagawa Cancer Center was established in 1986 as a professional diagnostic equipment to research of geriatric diseases which was higher in rank of death rate in Japan. When the Cancer Center started they have just 31 beds for patients, however the number of patients increased and the beds jumped to 415 recently. The Cancer Center has folded a full membership of the Union for International Cancer Control since 1987.

In November 2013, the Cancer Center relocated in the present place with the most up-to-date facilities.

Education
The Kanagawa Cancer Center Hospital is today a large cancer hospital as well as an recognised teaching facility for medical professionals including physicians and nurses specializing in clinical oncology. In addition, Yokohama City University Graduate School of Medicine is engaged in "Joint Graduate School Programs" with the Research Institute, Kanagawa Cancer Center.

Organization

Hospital

Departments
Gastroenterological Medical Oncology and Surgery
Thoracic Medical Oncology and Surgery
Breast Medical Oncology and Surgery
Gynecology (Gynecological Oncology)
Urology (Genitourinary Oncology)
Orthopedic Oncology
Head and Neck Oncology
Neurosurgery
Plastic and Reconstructive Surgery
Dermatology
Diagnostic Radiology
Pathology

I-ROCK (Ion-beam Radiation Oncology Center in Kanagawa)
Radiation Oncology

Research Institute

Departments
Molecular Pathobiology of Cancer
Biology of Cancer
Therapeutics of Cancer
Prophylaxis and Information Science of Cancer

Projects
Molecular Diagnostics Project
Hypoxia Biology Research Project
Epigenetics Research Project
Drug Molecular Design Research Project
Anticancer Drug Research Project
Molecular Diagnostic Project
Cancer Prevention Project

Administration

References

External links
 

Hospital buildings completed in 1961
Cancer hospitals
Hospitals in Yokohama
Hospitals established in 1986
Medical research institutes in Japan
1986 establishments in Japan